Little Creek may refer to:

Places in the United States
Little Creek, Delaware, a town in Kent County
Little Creek (Gualala River), a tributary of the Gualala River in California
Little Creek Hundred, Kent County, an unincorporated subdivision in Delaware
Little Creek Hundred, Sussex County, an unincorporated subdivision in Delaware
Little Creek, Georgia, an unincorporated community
Little Creek (Addition Creek tributary), a stream in Montana
Little Creek Peak, a mountain in Utah
Naval Amphibious Base Little Creek, a United States Navy base in Virginia Beach, Virginia

Waterways
Little River (Delaware), also called Little Creek, a tributary of Delaware Bay
Little Creek (North Fork River), a stream in Missouri
Little Creek (New Jersey), a river in Burlington County
Little Creek (New York), a tributary of Cayuga Lake
Little Creek (Cape Fear River tributary), a stream in Harnett County, North Carolina
Little Creek (East Branch Tunkhannock Creek tributary), a creek in Pennsylvania